Sir Egerton Leigh, 1st Baronet (11 October 1733 – 15 September 1781) was a British colonial jurist, who became HM Attorney-General of South Carolina.  He was a Loyalist who permanently fled South Carolina in 1774 for England.

Biography 
The son of Peter Leigh and Elizabeth née Latus, he was educated at Westminster School, London, before emigrating to America where his father was Chief Justice of South Carolina.

Leigh became a lawyer and served as a Member of Council and a Judge of the Vice-Admiralty Court, before becoming Surveyor-General of South Carolina.
He was appointed Attorney-General of South Carolina by King George III in 1765 and, on 15 May 1773, was created a Baronet, styled "of South Carolina, America".

In addition to his enterprises and legal positions, Leigh was a Freemason of the Moderns Lodges, and was elected and then re-elected as Provincial Grand Master of South Carolina in 1772, with a rather large celebration in Charleston for his election. Following his adultery scandal and his continued loyalty to the Crown, his credibility was ruined and no Masonic meetings were held, and by default Leigh remained Provincial Grand Master for nine years until he was finally seceded by John Deas in 1781.

In 1756 he married Martha Bremar (died 1801) and they had 13 children, including: Martha Leigh who married Nathan Garrick; Elizabeth Leigh who married Lieutenant-Colonel Friedrich Wilhelm, Baron von der Malsburg; Harriet Leigh who married Captain James Burnett, RM ; the Revd Sir Egerton Leigh, 2nd Baronet (born 1762); Sir Samuel Leigh, author of "Munster Abbey, a Romance: Interspersed with Reflections on Virtue and Morality" and father of Sir Samuel Egerton Leigh, 3rd Baronet (born 1796); and, Thomas Leigh a plantation owner in Georgetown County, where he remained settled after the American Revolutionary War.

See also 
 Leigh baronets

References

Further reading
 Robert M. Calhoon and Robert M. Weir, "The Scandalous History of Sir Egerton Leigh", William and Mary Quarterly (1969) 26#1  pp. 47–74 in JSTOR
 reprinted in Robert M. Calhoon and Robert M. Weir, "The Scandalous History of Sir  Edgerton Leigh" in

External links 
 Profile,  Cracroft's Peerage online. Accessed 9 December 2022.

1733 births
1781 deaths
People from Cheshire
People educated at Westminster School, London
British lawyers
South Carolina Attorneys General
Baronets in the Baronetage of Great Britain